Anokhi Ada may refer to:
 Anokhi Ada (1973 film), an Indian Hindi-language action film
 Anokhi Ada (1948 film), a romantic Hindi film